The following highways are numbered 389:

Canada
 Quebec Route 389

Japan
 Japan National Route 389

United States
  Arizona State Route 389
  Colorado State Highway 389
  Florida State Road 389
  Puerto Rico Highway 389
  South Carolina Highway 389
  Tennessee State Route 389
  Virginia State Route 389